Northern Scots refers to the dialects of Modern Scots traditionally spoken in eastern parts of the north of Scotland.

The dialect is generally divided into:

North Northern spoken in Caithness, Easter Ross and the Black Isle.
Mid Northern, popularly known as the Doric, spoken in Aberdeenshire, Banff and Buchan, Moray and the Nairn.
South Northern spoken in eastern Angus and the Mearns. 

North East Central Scots (Northeast Mid Scots) is also closely related to Northern Scots, particularly to South Northern Scots.

References
 

Scots dialects